The Daniel Angell House is a historic house at 15 Dean Avenue in Johnston, Rhode Island, United States.  The oldest portion of this  -story wood-frame structure was built c. 1725, although it was long attributed to Daniel Angell (1744-1810).  The house has an irregular front facade, seven bays wide, with two doors occupying the third and fifth bays.  The western part, likely the oldest portion of the house, has a large chimney centered on five bays.  The relatively unusual construction practices used in the house's construction, as well its remarkable state of preservation, make it a valuable resource in the study of Rhode Island colonial architecture.

The house was listed on the National Register of Historic Places in 1975.

See also
National Register of Historic Places listings in Providence County, Rhode Island

References

Houses on the National Register of Historic Places in Rhode Island
Houses in Providence County, Rhode Island
Buildings and structures in Johnston, Rhode Island
National Register of Historic Places in Providence County, Rhode Island